Puerto Rico women's national softball team is the national team for Puerto Rico.  The team competed at the 1986 ISF Women's World Championship in Auckland, New Zealand where they finished fifth.  The team competed at the 1990 ISF Women's World Championship in Normal, Illinois where they finished with 5 wins and 4 losses. The team competed at the 1994 ISF Women's World Championship in St. John's, Newfoundland where they finished ninth. The team competed at the 2002 ISF Women's World Championship in Saskatoon, Saskatchewan where they finished eighth. At the 2018 World Championship they placed 2nd in Group A with a record 6-1 before losing their next two games vs Japan and Canada finishing 5th overall.

All-Time Results

Summary

1986

References

External links 

 International Softball Federation

Softball
Women's national softball teams
Softball in Puerto Rico